Arad County was an administrative unit in the Kingdom of Hungary, the Eastern Hungarian Kingdom and the Principality of Transylvania. Its territory is now part of Romania, except a small area (the town of Elek and the surrounding villages) which is part of Hungary. The capital of the county was Arad.

Geography 
[[Image:Arad_county_map_(1891).jpg|thumb|left|alt=Map of Arad county in the Kingdom of Hungary|Map of Arad, 1891.]]
The medieval Arad County was situated in the lands along both banks of the Maros (Mureș) River. The existence of arable lands, pastures, vineyards and orchards in the western lowlands in the Middle Ages is well-documented. The hilly eastern regions were sparsely populated.

In 1744, Arad County absorbed a large part of Zaránd County, including its capital Zaránd/Zărand (the remainder of Zarand County was then reorganized, with Körösbánya/Baia de Criș as the new capital). In 1876, when the administrative structure of the Kingdom of Hungary was changed, the territory of Arad County was further modified to include the western third of the diminished Zaránd County, namely the Nagyhalmágy/Hălmagiu district (Zarand County was disbanded altogether on that occasion).

Arad County shared borders with the Hungarian counties of Csanád, Békés, Bihar, Torda-Aranyos, Hunyad, Krassó-Szörény, Temes and Torontál. The river Mureș formed its southern border. Crişul Alb River flowed through the county. Its area was  around 1910.

 History 

 Origins 

Place names of Slavic origin, including Lipova (Lippa) and Zăbrani (Temeshidegkút), evidence the presence of Slavic speaking communities, especially in the region where the river, coming from the mountains, reached the lowlands.

A powerful chieftain, Ajtony, ruled the territory along the rivers Danube, Maros and Tisza in the early . The Maros formed the northern border of Ajtony's realm, according to the Gesta Hungarorum, but the longer version of the Legend of Saint Gerard wrote that he controlled the lands as far as the Körös River. Ajtony was killed in a battle against the army of Stephen I of Hungary, which was under the command of Csanád. According to a scholarly theory, first proposed by historian György Györffy, Stephen I established Arad County after Ajtony's fall.

 Middle Ages 

The remains of an 11th-century stronghold, made of earth and timber, were found at Arad. At an assembly held in Arad in 1131, the wife of King Béla the Blind, Helena of Rascia, ordered the massacre of 68 Hungarian lords. Arad Castle and the estates attached to it were first documented in a royal charter, issued in 1177. The first known ispán, or head, of Arad County, Paul Csanád, was mentioned in a royal diploma, dated to 1214, but its authenticity is suspect. The earliest authentic document that referred to an ispán of Arad was issued in 1240. The western regions of the county were included in the Deanery of Arad of the Roman Catholic Diocese of Csanád; the Archdean of Arad was first mentioned in 1288.

The earliest documents suggest that the kings owned most lands in the plains along the Maros. For instance, Ladislaus I of Hungary and his brother, Lampert, granted five villages to the Titel Chapter before 1095 and Béla the Blind established the Arad Chapter in the 1130s. The Hodos clan was the only local noble kindred in the county; they were the patrons of the Hodoș-Bodrog Monastery. Members of the Csanád, Csák and Dorozsma clans received estates in Arad County in the early .

The effects of the Mongol invasion of Hungary cannot exactly be determined, but at least four monasteries disappeared. Solymos Castle (in present-day Șoimoș in Lipova), the first fortress built by a nobleman in the county, was erected after the withdrawal of the Mongols. The existence of four elected "judges of the nobles" was first documented in 1311, proving that Arad County had transformed into a "noble county", an institution of the local noblemen's self-government.

Lippa (present-day Lipova) became the most prosperous settlement in the early : the tax payable by the local priest to the Holy See between 1333 and 1335 (266 dinars) was almost ten times higher than the average tax collected in other parishes. The Slavs of the district of Lipova were converted into Catholicism in the middle of the century, according to John of Küküllő's contemporaneous chronicle. The earliest Romanian place name in the countyCaprewar'' (now Căprioara)was recorded in a list of the estates of the Telegdis which was completed in 1337.

Modern Times 

In 1920, the Treaty of Trianon assigned most of the territory of Arad county to Romania, except for a small area south of Békéscsaba, which became part of the newly-formed Hungarian county of Csanád-Arad-Torontál in 1923. At the end of World War II, the Hungarian part of Arad county was merged into the recreated Csanád county, but in 1950 that county was split and its territory became part of Békés County.

The rest of the county is now part of the Arad County in Romania. This county also contains parts of the former counties Temes and Krassó-Szörény.

Demographics

Subdivisions 

In the early 20th century, the subdivisions of Arad county were:

Elek is now in Hungary. All the other towns mentioned are in Romania.

List of ispáns

Middle Ages

Habsburg rule

Clickable map of the Arad County, 1782–85

Notes

References

Sources

States and territories established in 1741
States and territories disestablished in 1552
States and territories disestablished in 1920
States and territories disestablished in 1923
Banat
Crișana
Counties in the Kingdom of Hungary